Bartolf also known as Bartholomew was a Scottish and Hungarian nobleman and the founder of the Leslie family, who currently serve as Earls of Leven and Earls of Rothes and Lord Newark, all of which are situated in the historic kingdom of Scotland. He came over from Hungary in 1067 with Margaret later St Margaret of Scotland.

Bartolf is known for being the first governor of Edinburgh Castle in the 11th century, he moved to Scotland in 1067 and married king Malcolm III's sister Beatrix (of whom he founded the Leslie family with). He may have lived until the 12th century according to the Scottish Rampant Clan website.

Origin 
A 16th century descendant would claim that Bardolf was a nobleman of Hungarian origin who accompanied the Hungarian-born English prince, Edgar Ætheling, and his sister Margaret, later queen, to the kingdom of Scotland in 1067 following the Norman conquest of England. He was supposedly very brave and that is why he was given the title of Governor of Edinburgh Castle. It is said that his father went by the name of Walter de Lesthlin.

Earl of Ross and Lord Lesley 

He supposedly was given the title of Earl of Ross by king Malcolm Canmore and Lord Lesley which became Lord Leslie by 1445. This is according to a 19th century book on titles within Scotland.  His name in this book is the Latinised Bartholdus.

"Grip fast" legend 

As the Queen's Chamberlain, it was Bartolf's duty to carry the Queen on his own horse, with her riding pillion on a pad behind the saddle with a belt round his waist for her to hold. Tradition has it that one day while riding in this fashion they were crossing a swollen stream when the horse stumbled and the Queen fearing she would fall off cried "Gin the buckle bide?" (Will the buckle hold?), Bartolf, urging his horse to the other side answered crying "Grip Fast!" and they reached the other side safely. This incident so alarmed Bartolf that he had two more buckles added to his belt, so three buckles on a belt became the Arms of the Leslies and "Grip Fast!" became the motto.

Death 

According to the book "Historical records of the family of Leslie from 1067 to 1868-9 Vol.1" by Colonel Leslie KH of Balquhain, he died in 1121 and passed the title of Earl of Ross and Lord Lessley to his son Malcolm. Malcolm was created constable of the royal castle at Inverurie which he held for David I, and his great-grandson, Sir Norman de Leslie, acquired the lands of Fythkill in Fife, afterwards called Leslie, around 1282.

References 

Hungarian nobility
11th-century Scottish people
1121 deaths
1120s deaths
11th-century births
Clan Leslie
11th-century Hungarian people
Scottish people of Hungarian descent